Longs Pond is a lake within the Woodland Creek Community Park of Lacey, Washington.

Longs Pond was named after Jeremiah and Anna Long, local residents.

References

Lakes of Thurston County, Washington